Cropwell Friends Meeting House is a historic Quaker meeting house at 810 Cropwell Road in the Cropwell section of Evesham Township, Burlington County, New Jersey, United States.

Thomas Evans was one of the first Friends to settle in the Marlton area; in 1701, he signed a deed with Lenape leader King Himolin for a farm in what is now the Marlton area.  The property for a school was acquired in 1793 and the meetinghouse constructed in 1809. It was added to the National Register of Historic Places in 1992. 

An active Quaker congregation continues to worship in the building.

See also
National Register of Historic Places listings in Burlington County, New Jersey

References

External links

Evesham Township, New Jersey
Quaker meeting houses in New Jersey
Religious buildings and structures completed in 1793
18th-century Quaker meeting houses
National Register of Historic Places in Burlington County, New Jersey
New Jersey Register of Historic Places
1793 establishments in New Jersey